The Vuelta a España is an annual multi-stage bicycle race primarily held in Spain, while also occasionally making passes through nearby countries. Inspired by the success of the Tour de France and the Giro d'Italia, the race was first organised in 1935. The race was prevented from being run by the Spanish Civil War and World War II in the early years of its existence; however, the race has been held annually since 1955. As the Vuelta gained prestige and popularity the race was lengthened and its reach began to extend all around the globe. Since then, they have been working together. The peloton expanded from a primarily Spanish participation to include riders from all over the world. The Vuelta is a UCI World Tour event, which means that the teams that compete in the race are mostly UCI WorldTeams, with the exception of the wild card teams that the organizers can invite.

Along with the Tour de France and Giro d'Italia, the Vuelta is one of cycling's prestigious Grand Tours. While the route changes each year, the format of the race stays the same, with the appearance of at least two time trials, the passage through the mountain chain of the Pyrenees, and the finish in the Spanish capital Madrid. The modern editions of the Vuelta a España consist of 21 day-long stages over a 23-day period that includes 2 rest days.

All of the stages are timed to the finish; after finishing, the riders' times are compounded with their previous stage times. The rider with the lowest aggregate time is the leader of the race and gets to don the red jersey. While the general classification garners the most attention, there are other contests held within the Vuelta: the points classification for the sprinters, the mountains classification for the climbers, the combination classification for the all-round riders, and the team classification for the competing teams.

History
First held in 1935 and annually since 1955, the Vuelta runs for three weeks in a changing route across Spain. The inaugural event (1935) saw 50 entrants face a 3,411 km (2,119 mi.) course over only 14 stages, averaging over 240 km (149 mi.) per stage. It was inspired by the success of the Tours in France and Italy, and the boost they brought to the circulations of their sponsoring newspapers (L'Auto and La Gazzetta dello Sport respectively); Juan Pujol of the daily Informaciones instigated the race to increase its circulation.

It was originally held in the spring, usually late April, with a few editions held in June in the 1940s. In 1995, however, the race moved to September to avoid direct competition with the Giro d'Italia, held in May. As a result, the Vuelta is now often seen as an important preparation for the World Championships, which moved to October the same year. A Vuelta was also organized in August and September 1950. The race now usually starts in late August, but the 2020 race started in October due to a delay caused by the Covid-19 pandemic.

Typically, the course includes up to three time trials, and a number of mountain stages. Since 1994, and often before (such as in the inaugural edition), the Vuelta finished in the Spanish capital, Madrid, although Bilbao (in the 1950s) and San Sebastián (in the 1970s) were long both recurring finish cities. Behind Madrid, three cities share second place for the most Vuelta departures: Gijón, Bilbao, and one time finish city Jerez de la Frontera. In 1997, the Vuelta started abroad for the first time, in Lisbon, Portugal. The first ever Vuelta to start outside the Iberian Peninsula took place in 2009, when the Dutch city of Assen hosted the prologue of the 64th Vuelta.

In 1999, for the first time, the course crossed the Alto de L'Angliru in Asturias, which climbs 1,573 meters (5,160 feet) over 12.9 km (8 mi.) with grades as steep as 23.6 percent (at Cueña-les-Cabres), making it one of the steepest climbs in Europe. Credit for the discovery of this climb and its addition to the Vuelta goes to Miguel Prieto.

The overall leader at present wears a red jersey, although previously it has been the "Maillot amarillo" (Yellow jersey) and the "Jersey de Oro" (Golden jersey)— the Spanish counterpart to the yellow jersey of the Tour de France. Other jerseys honor the best climber (King of the Mountains, awarded a blue-on-white polka dot jersey) and leader of the points competition (for many years awarded a blue with yellow fish jersey sponsored by Spain's fishing and marine industry, but more recently given a green jersey). Usually, other cycling jerseys are awarded, such as for points leaders in the "Metas Volantes" (intermediate sprints) and for the combination category (a point system that honors the best rider with the combined total points in the best overall, points and mountains classifications).

The record for most wins is held by Roberto Heras of Spain, winner in 2000, 2003, 2004 and 2005. Spaniards have dominated, winning 30 of the 66 runnings of the Vuelta. France, Belgium, Switzerland, Italy, Germany, the Netherlands, Colombia, Ireland, Russia, Kazakhstan, the United States and Great Britain have also had first-place finishers.

1934–1936

The first races were run at the national level and were promoted by the bicycle manufacturers from Eibar. Consequently, the tour was Eibar – Madrid – Eibar, and called the Grand Prix of the Republic.

1935–1960

In early 1935, former cyclist Clemente López Doriga, in collaboration with Juan Pujol, director of the daily newspaper Informaciones, organized the Vuelta a España, with a distance of 3431 km, in a total of 14 stages. The first stage took the riders from Madrid to Valladolid. That year saw the first great duel in the history of the Vuelta, between Belgium's Gustaaf Deloor, who ultimately won, and Mariano Cañardo, Spanish runner-up. The second edition of the Vuelta, finally held despite the delicate political situation, was also marked by the Deeloor repeat, who this time held the lead from the first day to the last. After the first two editions, the Spanish race suffered a hiatus because of the Spanish Civil War.

In 1941, the Vuelta resumed competition with an almost entirely Spanish peloton and very little foreign representation. That year the first time trial was held in the Vuelta. Julián Berrendero was proclaimed the winner, and he recaptured the title the next year. In addition, Berrendero was King of the Mountains for three consecutive years.

With World War II and the precarious economic situation, there was another break in the running of the Vuelta a España.

In 1945, the Journal took over organization of the race and competition resumed, although again with few foreign competitors in the peloton. On this occasion, Delio Rodríguez took the final victory. That year also introduced the points classification, but this was not stable until 1955. Four editions were run until 1950.

Subsequently, there was no Vuelta until 1955, when it was organized by the Basque newspaper El Correo Español-El Pueblo Vasco. Since then, the Vuelta a España has been run annually. At this time, the Vuelta is run routinely in August and September, but it was previously run in April and May. Another difference was the number of participants. Previously, there were very few, but the number doubled, with more internationally recognized competitors.

1960–1970

The prestige of the Vuelta increased, with more stars from the international cycling scene. During the late 1950s came the first successes in the overall standings of Italian and French riders. In the 1960s, they would also be joined by German and Dutch riders. In 1963, Jacques Anquetil won the general classification, establishing himself as the first rider to win all three Grand Tours. Five years later, in 1968, Felice Gimondi would do the same. Eddy Merckx (1973), Bernard Hinault (1978, 1983), Alberto Contador (2008), and Vincenzo Nibali (2010) later accomplished the same treble.

Antonio Karmany dominated the mountain classification for three consecutive years, then was replaced by Julio Jiménez, who won it for another three years.

In 1965, Rik Van Looy became the first rider to repeat victory in the points classification. Jan Janssen in 1968 and 1974 Domingo Perurena would do the same, winning this classification twice.

During mid 60's the organizer of the Vuelta, El Correo Español-El Pueblo Vasco, went through some financial problems that endangered the running of the competition. However, during that time all editions ended normally. In 1968, the Vuelta was hit by a terrorist attack and other events, having to cancel the 15th stage. There were no fatalities.

1970–1980

The '70s began with the triumph of Luis Ocaña, who was already established in the international squad as one of the greats of cycling.

José Manuel Fuente, with victories in 1972 and 1974, became the third rider to win two Tours of Spain. A few years later, Bernard Hinault repeated the feat, which was also achieved by Pedro Delgado during the 1980s.

In 1973, Eddy Merckx won the Vuelta by a landslide, winning six stages and all individual classifications with the exception of the mountains competition: he finished second.

Freddy Maertens in 1977 echoed a similar domination to that demonstrated by Merckx a few years earlier, by winning thirteen stages and all individual classifications except the mountain.

In the mid-1970s, Andrés Oliva managed to earn the King of the Mountains title in three editions of the Vuelta.

Frenchman Bernard Hinault emerged in 1978 as an international cycling star. The same year, Hinault won his first Tour de France. The last stage of that edition also had to be suspended because of riots and barricades that prevented the normal course of it.

When 1979 El Correo Español-El Pueblo Vasco left as a sponsor of the race, the Vuelta was once again endangered. However, the company Unipublic took charge of the competition. This, coupled with increased advertising and the beginning of the broadcasts via television, further grew revenue and interest in the Vuelta.

1980–1990

In the early 1980s, two names stood out in the secondary classifications: José Luis Laguía, who won the mountain classification five times, and Sean Kelly, who won four times in the points classification.

In 1982 came the first case of disqualification of the winner for doping. Two days after the end of the competition, Ángel Arroyo and a few other riders were disqualified, and Arroyo lost his victory to Marino Lejarreta. Arroyo appealed for a B test of his sample, which again tested positive. Arroyo was given a ten-minute penalty, and ultimately ended up placing thirteenth in the general classification.

Next year's edition was the first appearance of the Lagos de Covadonga as a final stage, an ascent that would become, over the years, the most iconic climb of the Vuelta a España. In 1984 it played the issue in a race that ended with the smallest difference between the first and second place. Éric Caritoux, a complete unknown until then, managed to win the Vuelta with only six seconds ahead of Alberto Fernández in second place.

The end of the 80s was marked by the rise of Colombian cycling, which presented a strong challenge particularly in the mountain stages. Names such as Lucho Herrera (winner in 1987) or Fabio Parra (2nd in 1989) appeared in the last editions of the decade. One of the rulers at that time was also Pedro Delgado, with two victories (1985 and 1989), a second place, and two third-place finishes. In the 1988 edition, the start took place in the Canary Islands with 3 stages.

1990–2000

The first half of the 1990s was marked by the dominance of Swiss rider Tony Rominger, the first rider to win three times and win the race consecutively between 1992 and 1994.

The fiftieth edition of the Vuelta, which was held in 1995, coincided with the change of dates. The Vuelta a España came to be held in September, and near the end of the season. That year Laurent Jalabert won all classifications, the second time this happened in the Vuelta (Rominger had done so in 1993). The Frenchman was also a four-time winner of the points classification, matching the previous record set by Kelly in the '80s.

In 1997, the tour started for the first time in a foreign country. They began in Lisbon, on the occasion of Expo '98.

The ascent of the Alto de L'Angliru was part of a stage for the first time in 1999, with the victory of José María Jiménez, four-time winner of the mountains classification. The reputation of the climb grew rapidly because of its demanding nature.

2000–2010
The first editions of the 2000s were marked by the dominance of Roberto Heras, who achieved victory on three occasions, and in 2005 did it for the fourth time. However, as happened with Ángel Arroyo in 1982, Heras was disqualified days after the end of the competition after testing positive in a doping test, this time for use of EPO. This positive development was later ratified by the counter-analysis and Heras was stripped of his title, benefiting the Russian cyclist Denis Menchov until 2012, when the Spanish Courts overturned the positive test and re-awarded the win to Heras. In 2006 Alexander Vinokourov won after a struggle with the then leader of the UCI Pro Tour, Alejandro Valverde. In the 2007 edition Denis Menchov again clinched the overall victory by more than three minutes over the Spanish cyclists Carlos Sastre and Samuel Sánchez. In June 2008, French company Amaury Sport Organisation (ASO), who organize the Tour de France, announced it had bought 49% of Unipublic.

In 2008, the winner was the Spaniard Alberto Contador, who also won that year's Giro d'Italia, and became the first Spaniard to win all three Grand Tours. In 2009, the Vuelta began in Drenthe, Netherlands, continuing through Belgium and Germany. The final winner was Alejandro Valverde, who adopted a conservative stance without winning any stage and sprinting in the final meters to achieve bonuses. His main rivals were Samuel Sánchez (second place), Cadel Evans (third), Ivan Basso, Robert Gesink and Ezequiel Mosquera. All of them suffered critical falls or punctures such as Evans in Monachil.

2010–present

After Vincenzo Nibali won in 2010 he was unable to defend his title in 2011. The surprise winner of the race that year was Juan José Cobo who took a narrow 13 second win over Chris Froome. In 2019 Cobo's win was annulled for doping violations, and the race awarded to Froome. In 2012 Alberto Contador claimed the title edging out Spanish compatriots Alejandro Valverde and Joaquim Rodríguez only one month after returning to competitive racing after a drugs ban.

The 2013 Vuelta a España saw a shock result when the 41-year-old American Chris Horner defeated Vincenzo Nibali, Alejandro Valverde and Joaquim Rodríguez to become the first North American to win the Vuelta and the oldest rider to win a grand tour. In addition Horner clinched the race's combination classification. The race was also notable for Tony Martin's all-day solo break on stage 6, when he broke away at the start and led for nearly the entire stage before being caught 20 metres from the finish line, placing seventh behind stage winner Michael Mørkøv.

In March 2014, ASO acquired full control of Unipublic, with both working together with the running of the race. The 2014 race featured a field described as the strongest in a grand tour in recent memory, as a range of accomplished riders entered the race after suffering injuries or health problems earlier in the season. Contador claimed his third Vuelta, with Froome finishing as runner-up, after both men withdrew from the 2014 Tour de France due to injury.

The 2015 edition saw another strong field contest the race, including the top four finishers at the 2015 Tour de France (Froome, Valverde, Nibali and Nairo Quintana) and two of the podium finishers from the 2015 Giro d'Italia in the form of Nibali's teammates Fabio Aru and Mikel Landa. With the withdrawals of Chris Froome and the disqualification of Vincenzo Nibali, it was left to Fabio Aru to claim his first grand tour victory. Nairo Quintana won the 2016 edition.

The 2017 edition was won by Chris Froome, making it his second overall victory with the awarding of the 2011 title. The victory capped off a successful completion of the rare Tour-Vuelta double and made him at the time the first British rider to win the race, a distinction he maintained upon the award of the 2011 race. In 2018, it was another British rider who won the race, in Simon Yates, riding for the Mitchelton–Scott. Aged 26 this was Yates' first grand tour win, and meant that for the first time all three grand tours in a year had been won by three different riders from the same country. The 2019 Vuelta was won by Primož Roglič, who became the first Slovenian cyclist to win a Grand Tour. He went on to defend his title the next year winning again, in a hard-fought race with Richard Carapaz that was one of the closest finishes in recent history; and in 2021 he dominated the field with one of the largest margins of victory in more than two decades to make it three Vuelta's in a row.

Starts abroad
Most stages are in mainland Spain, although since the mid-1990s it has become common to visit nearby countries: Portugal, Andorra and France. It has also taken place in the Netherlands, Germany and Belgium. Four editions of the Vuelta so far have started outside Spain. A start abroad in Utrecht, Netherlands was planned for the 2020 edition, however this was cancelled in light of the COVID-19 pandemic and a revised route starting in Irun was used in 2020. Instead, the 2022 Vuelta a España started in Utrecht.

1997:  Lisbon, Portugal
2009:  Assen, Netherlands
2017:  Nîmes, France
2022:  Utrecht, Netherlands

Classifications

The leader of the general classification is permitted to wear a jersey of a particular colour signifying the lead (maillot rojo or red jersey), as in the Tour de France (maillot jaune or yellow jersey) and the Giro d'Italia (maglia rosa or pink jersey). The colour of the leader's jersey of the Vuelta a España has changed several times since the original tour. The organizers who revived the Vuelta following its multiple suspensions since 1936 usually changed the color of the jersey. The leader's jersey began as orange in 1935, became white in 1941, then back to orange in 1942. It was white with a horizontal red stripe from 1945 to 1950. In 1955, when El Correo resurrected the Vuelta, yellow became the colour of the leader's jersey, the same color as in the Tour de France. Except for the 1977 Vuelta, when the jersey was orange, a yellow jersey was worn until 1998, when the color was deepened to a gold hue. However, for the 2010 edition, the colour of the leader's jersey was changed to red.

Since the 1950 Vuelta, the leaders of the other race classifications have been permitted to wear identifying jerseys (previously, there was an official mountain classification, but no identifying jersey). For a long time, a blue jersey identified the leader of the points classification, green the leader of the mountain classification, and white the leader of the combination classification (until it ended in 2018). Recently, these other classifications have used jerseys more like those used at the Tour de France, with the points leader using a green jersey, the King of the Mountains using a polka dot jersey (albeit blue-on-white rather than red-on-white as at the Tour) and the best young rider a white jersey.

Stage wins

Stage wins per rider

17 riders have won 10 or more individual stages.

active riders are in bold

Stage wins per country

Records

 Most Vuelta a España victories: Roberto Heras, 4
 Most Vuelta a España Stage wins: Delio Rodríguez, 39
 Most stage wins in one edition: Freddy Maertens in 1977, 13
 Most individual time trial wins: Abraham Olano, Alex Zülle, and Tony Rominger, 6
 Most number of victories by country: Spain, 32
 Most days as leader: Alex Zülle, 48
 Most mountains classification victories: José Luis Laguía, 5
 Most points classification victories: Sean Kelly, Laurent Jalabert and Alejandro Valverde, 4
 Most number of intermediate sprints classification victories: Miguel Ángel Iglesias, 5
 Largest margin of victory: Delio Rodríguez over Julián Berrendero in 1945, 30' 8"
 Smallest margin of victory: Éric Caritoux over Alberto Fernández in 1984, 6 seconds
 Most participations: Íñigo Cuesta, 17 (1994–2010).
 Most consecutive participations: Íñigo Cuesta, 17 (1994–2010).
 Most Vueltas finished: Federico Echave, 14 (1982–1995), and Íñigo Cuesta, 14 (1994, 1996–99, 2001–03 and 2005–10)
 Most consecutive Vueltas finished: Federico Echave, 14 (1982–1995).
 Fewest participants: 1941, 32
 Greatest number of participants: 2002, 207
 Fastest average speed: 2001, 42.534 km/h
 Slowest average speed: 1941, 26.262 km/h
 Longest edition: 1941, 4,442 km
 Shortest edition: 1963, 2,419 km
 Youngest general classification winner: Angelino Soler in 1961, age 
 Oldest general classification winner: Chris Horner in 2013, age

References

External links
 
 Sportlistings

 
1
Recurring sporting events established in 1935
UCI ProTour races
UCI World Tour races
1935 establishments in Spain
Grand Tour (cycling)
Annual sporting events in Spain
September sporting events
Challenge Desgrange-Colombo races
Super Prestige Pernod races